The Tornado Intercept Vehicle 1 (TIV 1) and Tornado Intercept Vehicle 2 (TIV 2) are vehicles used to film with an IMAX camera from very close to or within a tornado. They were designed by film director Sean Casey. Both TIVs have intercepted numerous tornadoes, including the June 12, 2005 Jayton, TX tornado, the June 5, 2009 La Grange WY tornado, and the strongest intercept, made by TIV 2, May 27, 2013 Lebanon, KS tornado.

TIV 1
The Tornado Intercept Vehicle 1 (TIV 1) is a heavily modified 1997 Ford F-Super Duty cab & chassis truck used as a storm chasing platform and built by Sean Casey. This heavily armored vehicle can drive into a weak to relatively strong tornado (EF0 to EF3) to film it and take measurements. Work began on the TIV in 2002 and took around eight months to finish, at a total cost of around US$81,000. TIV's armored shell consists of 1/8–1/4 inch steel plate welded to a two-inch square steel tubing frame. The TIV weighs approximately  fully loaded and is powered by a 7.3 litre Ford Powerstroke turbocharged diesel engine manufactured by Navistar-International, otherwise known as the International T444E. The vehicle includes air-ride suspension that, when deployed, drops the vehicle flush to the ground to prevent wind from getting under the vehicle. Four hydraulic claws were added at Discovery Channel’s request for safety, which are used to grapple onto the ground and anchor the TIV during an intercept. The TIV is featured in a series called Storm Chasers which began airing on the Discovery Channel in October 2007. TIV was succeeded in 2008 by TIV 2, but returned to service to finish out the first few chases of the 2008 storm chasing season after TIV 2 suffered mechanical problems. In a June 2011 interview with NPR's All Things Considered, Casey said that TIV is still in service and is designated as the backup vehicle in the event TIV 2 breaks down during a shoot.

After no longer needing the vehicle, Casey abandoned the vehicle on a central Kansas farm. On a Facebook post, Casey placed the TIV as a prize for a scavenger hunt. The first one to find it got to keep it. Many took to the scavenger hunt, but it was Wichita-based storm chaser Robert Clayton who found the vehicle in 2021. Clayton's restoration plan for TIV 1 includes removing the claws and adding hydraulic anchoring spikes similar to TIV 2, repairing the air-ride suspension to drop TIV to the ground to prevent wind from getting underneath the vehicle, repainting the vehicle black, and adding instrumentation to collect data for future research.

TIV 2

Casey and his team developed and built the second Tornado Intercept Vehicle, dubbed TIV 2, to be featured in their next IMAX movie and the Storm Chasers series. Work began in September 2007 by forty welding students at the Great Plains Technology Center in Lawton, Oklahoma and was completed in time for the 2008 tornado chase season. TIV 2 was designed to address some of the problems experienced with the original TIV, namely its low ground clearance, lack of four-wheel drive, and low top speed. It is based on a Dodge Ram 3500  that was strengthened and converted to six-wheel drive by adding a third axle. After season two the six-wheel drive system was modified to four-wheel drive. It is powered by a 6.7-liter Cummins turbocharged diesel engine, modified with propane and water injection to produce . The body of TIV 2 is constructed of a 1/8-inch steel skin welded over a  square tubing steel frame. The windows in TIV 2 are all bullet-resistant  interlayered polycarbonate sheets and tempered glass. TIV 2 also features an IMAX filming turret similar to the one on the original TIV. The original TIV's somewhat cumbersome hydraulic claws were not used on TIV 2 in favor of six hydraulic skirts that drop down to deflect wind over the TIV to stabilize it and protect the underside from debris.

TIV 2 debuted on the second season of Storm Chasers, which began airing on the Discovery Channel in October 2008. Its initial performance did not go well, as it was plagued by mechanical failures, including several broken axles, which forced Casey to abandon TIV 2 and return to chasing in the original TIV until TIV 2's issues could be resolved. Despite Discovery Channel showing that TIV 2 was out of commission for the majority of the season, TIV 2 could be seen chasing through to the end of the season, including the May 29, 2008 Kearny, NE tornado, though it was not shown in the series.

In the fall of 2008, TIV 2 received several modifications, mostly focused on reducing the vehicle's  weight. To achieve this, less crucial areas of TIV 2's armor were converted from steel to aluminum while more vital areas were reinforced with supplemental composite armor consisting of thin layers of steel, Kevlar, polycarbonate, and rubber. The safety systems were also improved, with the three front wind flaps being consolidated into one skirt, and new hydraulic stabilizing spikes to further increase stability in high winds. Other modifications included additional doors that provided every seat position with an exit (wind skirts up or down), and a redesigned IMAX turret with 50% more windows. The third axle was disconnected from the drive train, thus changing TIV 2 to a 6×4 from its 6×6 design. The third axle now acts as a brace for the vehicle's weight.

The TIV 2 appeared again before the halfway point of the third season of Storm Chasers. In between seasons three and four of Storm Chasers, TIV 2 also appeared in an episode of another Discovery Channel series, Mythbusters, wherein both the TIV 2 and the SRV Dominator vehicle operated by Reed Timmer of TornadoVideos.Net were tested to determine their endurance to storm-force winds by being parked behind a Boeing 747 with the engines at full throttle. TIV 2 would intercept a tornado La Grange, WY in 2009 would be his intercept shot he needed for his IMAX film. Future chases in TIV 2 would be for b-roll footage of the TIV 2 and for his new IMAX film.

In 2011, a siren was added to the vehicle to allow the TIV 2 to act as a mobile warning system for civilians in the path of incoming tornadoes, after several incidents earlier that year where the TIV 2 team was unable to effectively warn locals of the imminent danger of the tornadoes they were tracking, especially during the 2011 Super Outbreak. On April 27, 2011, the TIV 2 team intercepted an EF4 tornado that hit near Enterprise, Mississippi. While not in the path but 200 yards from it, it was the first tornado he shot with his new stereoscopic IMAX camera.

Casey removed the rear flap in early 2012 and built a new set of two hydraulic spikes that go into the ground during an intercept.

On May 27, 2013, TIV 2 intercepted a large tornado near Smith Center, Kansas. The vehicle was struck by large debris from a nearby farm and suffered damage to the roof-mounted anemometer and at least two breaches of the crew compartment when the roof hatch and one of the doors were blown open.

On October 21, 2019, Casey listed the TIV 2 on Craigslist for US$35,000 and it was later sold to storm chaser Ryan Shepard.  The TIV 2 was fully restored and back on the road again in the 2021 storm season, where it made multiple close intercepts on June 10 in western North Dakota. It is under sponsorship of Storm of Passion and Live Storm Chasers.

Instrumentation
Although primarily designed to shoot film from near or within tornadoes, the TIV's have at times been outfitted with meteorological instrumentation atop masts to complement the Doppler on Wheels (DOW) radar trucks of the Center for Severe Weather Research run by atmospheric scientist and inventor Joshua Wurman.

See also 

 SRV Dominator

References

External links 
 Tornado Alley IMAX movie
 How the Tornado Intercept Vehicle Works
 TIV images
 Riders on the storm
 Ryan Shepard

Meteorological instrumentation and equipment
Tornado
Armoured cars
Storm chasing